Ramon Pascal Lundqvist (born 10 May 1997) is a Swedish professional footballer who plays as an attacking midfielder for Eredivisie club Groningen.

Career
On 18 September 2015, Lundqvist made his senior debut for Jong PSV, playing the entire match in a 3–0 defeat to Sparta Rotterdam in the Eerste Divisie. A year later, he made his debut for PSV, playing the final ten minutes in a 4–0 win over NEC.

On 26 August 2021, Lundqvist joined Panathinaikos on a season-long loan, with a purchase option of €850,000.

Personal life
Born in Sweden, Lundqvist is of Nicaraguan descent. He is a youth international for Sweden, having played up to the Sweden U19s.

Career statistics

Honours
Panathinaikos
Greek Cup: 2021–22

References

External links
 
 
 Ramon Lundqvist at SofaScore
 Ramon Lundqvist veertiende Zweed bij FC Groningen

1997 births
Living people
People from Mörbylånga Municipality
Association football midfielders
Swedish footballers
Sweden youth international footballers
Swedish people of Nicaraguan descent
Swedish expatriate footballers
Eredivisie players
Eerste Divisie players
Super League Greece players
PSV Eindhoven players
Jong PSV players
NAC Breda players
FC Groningen players
Panathinaikos F.C. players
Swedish expatriate sportspeople in the Netherlands
Expatriate footballers in the Netherlands
Swedish expatriate sportspeople in Greece
Expatriate footballers in Greece
Sportspeople from Kalmar County